Live at Maybeck Recital Hall, Volume Thirteen is an album of solo performances by jazz pianist Steve Kuhn, recorded in 1990.

Music and recording
The album was recorded in November 1990 at the Maybeck Recital Hall in Berkeley, California. Kuhn deconstructs and then reconstructs "I Remember You" and "Autumn in New York".

Release and reception

Live at Maybeck Recital Hall, Volume Thirteen was released by Concord Records. The Penguin Guide to Jazz concluded that the album was "Impressive and worthwhile", but commented that "Kuhn's sometimes extreme opposition of left and right hands [...] still betrays a certain crudity towards the bass end." The AllMusic reviewer wrote that, "This very satisfying concert CD is well-worth acquiring".

Track listing
"Old Folks"
"Solar"
"Don't Explain"
"I Remember You"
"Autumn in New York"
"The Meaning of the Blues"

Personnel
Steve Kuhn – piano

References

1990 live albums
Albums recorded at the Maybeck Recital Hall
Concord Records live albums
Solo piano jazz albums